The Motor City Labor League or Motor City Labor Coalition was a labor organization based in Detroit, Michigan, U.S. It adhered to a form of Marxism–Leninism and operated under the principle of democratic centralism. 

It was the white counterpart of the League of Revolutionary Black Workers.

Besides work in among Detroit's working class, it focused on organizing against the war in Vietnam, supporting  radical organizing in local unions, opposition to STRESS, a Detroit police unit known for police brutality. Electorally, it successfully worked to get one of its members, lawyer Justin C. Ravitz, to Detroit's Recorder's Court.

References

Defunct Marxist–Leninist parties in the United States
Organizations established in 1969
1960s in Detroit
1970s in Detroit
Allies (social justice)
Anti-fascist organizations in the United States
Anti-racist organizations in the United States
Defunct American political movements
Far-left politics in the United States
Organizations based in Detroit
White American culture in Michigan
White American organizations
1969 establishments in Michigan